After CBS lost the American television rights of the National Hockey League to NBC following the 1971-72 season (CBS was paying less than $2 million a year and NBC jumped to $5.3 million), the network covered the inaugural season of the World Hockey Association. The WHA's TV deal permitted it to sell week‐night games to other networks (CBS meanwhile, would show games on Sunday afternoons in addition the all-star game and playoffs). In addition, the WHA also sold a $3‐million package to Canada. On January 7, 1973, CBS aired its first WHA game between the Minnesota Fighting Saints and Winnipeg Jets live from the new St. Paul Civic Center with Ron Oakes, Gerry Cheevers and Dick Stockton announcing.

Local broadcasters

Notes
The Michigan Stags' radio station was WWJ 950. Gary Morrel was play-by-play announcer while Norm Plummer handled color commentary. (At least one broadcast had only two sponsors mentioned: Nolwood Chemical, a company owned by the Stags' owners, and the Stags themselves.) Michigan played just one game on local television: the season opener against the Indianapolis Racers, broadcast live from Indianapolis on WXON Channel 20. Detroit radio icon Vince Doyle called play-by-play and former Red Wing Marty Pavelich was the color commentator. The Stags won the game, 4-2, but few saw it; the Stags were up against game five of the 1974 World Series. Eight other games were scheduled to be televised but money became a problem by mid-November, especially after Michigan lost 11 of their next 12 following their season-opening win.
Games of the original Minnesota Fighting Saints were heard on WLOL Radio (1330 AM) from 1972 to 1976, with Frank Buetel as play-by-play announcer. Buetel was the original TV voice of the NHL's Minnesota North Stars from 1967 to 1970 on WTCN-TV (now KARE-TV). Buetel's color commentators included Roger Buxton and Bob Halvorson, the Saints' first-season public relations director (1972–73), and Bill Allard (1973–76). Al Hirt's version of "When the Saints Go Marching In" was used as the theme song for WLOL's Fighting Saints broadcasts. No local radio station carried games of the New Fighting Saints (1976–77). Fighting Saints games were televised sporadically on WTCN from 1973 to 1975. The first WTCN game was a home contest versus Cleveland on December 23, 1973, with Buetel and Allard simulcasting. Buxton called subsequent games on WTCN. In the 1973–74 season, one Saints home game was carried on KTCA-TV (PBS). No local TV station aired games of the New Fighting Saints.

See also
List of Edmonton Oilers broadcasters
List of Hartford Whalers broadcasters
Quebec Nordiques#Broadcasters
List of Winnipeg Jets broadcasters

References

 
Ice hockey-related lists
CBC Sports
CBS Sports
Mizlou Television Network